Point Blunt Light is a lighthouse on Angel Island in San Francisco Bay, California.

History
Point Blunt Lighthouse was established in 1915. The lighthouse was automated in 1976.

From Coast Guard web site in 1970, before the lighthouse was automated: 
Point Blunt Light was originally maintained by personnel at Angel Island Light Station at Point Knox until 1960. In 1960 a new watch room was constructed at Point Blunt which afforded a view of the entire San Francisco Bay. With the new watch room and new quarters completed in 1961 at Point Blunt, the Coast Guard moved the personnel from Angel Island Light Station.

Personnel at Point Blunt operate their own light and fog signals. The station also provides special direction finder calibration services as requested. Four family units, 3 bedrooms each, are at Point Blunt. Two units are Coast Guard owned, two are leased from the State of California. One unit is occupied by the Officer in Charge and his family. The other units are presently being utilized by the married crew members and their families. One small boat is assigned to the station. A pickup truck is assigned. Point Blunt Light Station rates a BM1 as Officer in Charge, plus one EN2, one FN, and one SN.

Jurisdiction

California Government Code section 23138, added in 1947, describes the northern boundary of San Francisco County as "Thence, Easterly, through Point Bonita and Point Calvaljo, to the most southeastern point of Angel Island, all on the line of Marin."

In 1960, to add the watchroom, the Bay was filled in between the southeastern point of Angel Island and the Point Blunt Rock - originally an Island. Consequently, Point Blunt is an exclave of San Francisco County; however, the land itself is a Federal Enclave. The area below the mean high tide of the Federal Enclave, however, is not a Federal Enclave because California assumed sovereignty over the waters when it became a State in 1850. As a port facility, the lighthouse served the Port of San Francisco, which was transferred from State to San Francisco control in 1969. In 1976, the People of the State of California adopted the Coastal act, making the area below the mean high tide a condominium of the County and the California Coastal Commission, and the Coastal Act required beach access for all California beaches, meaning there is a constitutionally-guaranteed right of way through the State Park property to the beach of the Federal Enclave.

Because the beach above the mean high tide is a Federal enclave and not part of Angel Island State Park, like Baker Beach in the Presidio of San Francisco, it is not subject to local ordinances. There is no federal or statewide law prohibiting nudity. Moreover, because it is part of a Port of call, any vessel flying a friendly flag may anchor and its inhabitants may disembark and disrobe as long as they stay below the mean high tide. If they cross above it, they must proceed directly to customs; however, there is no customs house on the point. Immunity from local law applies to individuals in transit to customs as long as they do not tarry, so they will have transit immunity while they walk through Angel Island State Park to the ferry, over the Golden Gate Bridge, and to the Federal Customs House near Fishermans' Wharf.

References

External links
  
 Angel Island-Tiburon Ferry

Lighthouses completed in 1915
Lighthouses in San Francisco